Shalaurov Island or Shalaurova Island is a small island in the eastern end of the East Siberian Sea. It is close to the coast, being only 1.2 km away from a headland located west of the estuary of the Pegtymel River. It lies roughly midway between Cape Shelagskiy and Cape Billings in the Chukotka Autonomous Okrug. The island is named after Russian polar explorer, merchant Nikita Shalaurov.

This island is only 0.8 km across, and is inhabited by kittiwakes.

References

 Location
 Eskimo Archaeology
 

Islands of the East Siberian Sea
Islands of Chukotka Autonomous Okrug